Louvetot is a commune in the Seine-Maritime department in the Normandy region in northern France.

Geography

Heraldry

Population

Places of interest
 The church of Notre-Dame, dating from the thirteenth century.
 An old manorhouse.

See also
Communes of the Seine-Maritime department

References

Communes of Seine-Maritime